The 1983 IIHF European U18 Championship was the sixteenth playing of the IIHF European Junior Championships.

Group A
Played in Oslo, Norway from March 19–25, 1983.

First round 
Group 1

Group 2

Final round
Championship round

Placing round

Norway was relegated to Group B for 1984.

Tournament Awards
Top Scorer  Igor Vyazmikin (12 points)
Top Goalie: Jarmo Myllys
Top Defenceman:Petr Svoboda
Top Forward: Igor Vyazmikin

Group B
Played in Zoetermeer, the Netherlands from March 21–27, 1983.

First round 
Group 1

Group 2

Final round 
First round

Placing round

The Netherlands was promoted to Group A and Hungary was relegated to Group C, for 1984.

Group C
Played in Sarajevo, Yugoslavia from March 3–6, 1983.

Yugoslavia was promoted to Group B for 1984.

References

Complete results

1982–83 in European ice hockey
1983
International sports competitions in Oslo
Sports competitions in Sarajevo
1983 IIHF European U18 Championship
1983 IIHF European U18 Championship
March 1983 sports events in Europe
International ice hockey competitions hosted by the Netherlands
International ice hockey competitions hosted by Yugoslavia
International ice hockey competitions hosted by Norway
1982–83 in Norwegian ice hockey
1982–83 in Dutch ice hockey
1982–83 in Yugoslav ice hockey
1983 IIHF European U18 Championship
1983 IIHF European U18 Championship